The Sounds of Science may refer to:

 Beastie Boys Anthology: The Sounds of Science, a Beastie Boys anthology
 "The Sounds of Science" (song), the 6th track on the album Paul's Boutique by the Beastie Boys